Lübberstedt is a village located in the district of Osterholz in the German state of Lower Saxony. It is located north of Osterholz-Scharmbeck. Together with the villages of Hambergen, Axstedt, Holste and Vollersode, it forms the Samtgemeinde of Hambergen.

History 
During the last year of the war (1944) a Neuengamme sub-camp was erected near the village for Jewish women from Auschwitz-Birkenau.  Several female guards (Aufseherin) staffed the camp and maltreated the prisoners who were starved, overworked and brutalized.

Transport 
Lübberstedt has a railway station on the Bremerhaven to Bremen line that opened in 1862. The main road is the B 74 connecting Bremen and Stade.

References 

Neuengamme concentration camp
Osterholz